The first station in the area opened in 1860 as Dudley and served Dudley Colliery and the village of Dudley in North Tyneside, England. It was located on the East Coast Main Line to the north of Newcastle upon Tyne. In 1874 it was renamed Dudley Colliery before becoming Annitsford in April 1878. On 8 July 1878 the station was closed and replaced with a second station 352 yards south of the first station. The railway station was located in Dudley but was named after the nearby village of Annitsford, to avoid confusion with another Dudley in the Midlands.

History

Opened by the North Eastern Railway, it became part of the London and North Eastern Railway during the Grouping of 1923. The line then passed on to the Eastern Region of British Railways on nationalisation in 1948.

The station was then closed by the British Transport Commission.

The site today

Trains still pass on the now electrified East Coast Main Line.

References
 
 
 
 Station on navigable O.S. map

External links 

Disused railway stations in Tyne and Wear
Former North Eastern Railway (UK) stations
Railway stations in Great Britain opened in 1860
Railway stations in Great Britain closed in 1878
Railway stations in Great Britain opened in 1878
Railway stations in Great Britain closed in 1958